Stephen Pasay (born November 4, 1997), better known by the stage name Stephanie Prince, is a Filipino-Canadian drag performer most known for competing on season 2 of Canada's Drag Race and the spin-off Canada's Drag Race: Canada vs. the World. Born in the Philippines, she resides in Calgary, Alberta.

Career
Stephanie Prince competed on the second season of Canada's Drag Race. Josiah Antonio, ABS-CBN News said of her time on the show: "Stephanie Prince gave a remarkable showing on the runaway with her Jollibee-inspired entrance look. She was also praised during the design challenge with her high fashion dress made of posters."

Stephanie Prince returned to compete on the spin-off Canada's Drag Race: Canada vs. the World in November 2022. She was placed in the bottom two alongside fellow Canada's Drag Race Season 2 contestant Kendall Gender in the first episode following a girl group challenge, however she was saved by Vanity Milan, who represented the British version of the franchise, who eliminated Kendall Gender. The following episode, Stephanie Prince portrayed Cardi B during the Snatch Game challenge, which landed her in the bottom two for the second consecutive week, this time alongside Anita Wigl'it, who represented the Australian and New Zealand version of the franchise. Icesis Couture, who won the second season of Canada's Drag Race, decided to eliminate Stephanie Prince during this episode.

Filmography

Television

Discography

As featured artist

References

1997 births
Living people
21st-century Canadian LGBT people
Canada's Drag Race contestants
Canadian drag queens
Filipino emigrants to Canada
People from Calgary